The United States is a country located mainly in North America.

United States  may also refer to:

Arts and entertainment
 United States (TV series), a 1980 American sitcom 
 United States (album), 2009, by Paul Gilbert and Freddie Nelson
 United States, a 2014 album by Ian McLagan
 "United States", a song by Smashing Pumpkins from the 2007 album Zeitgeist

Transportation
 , a retired ocean liner built in 1950
 , a merchant steamship lost in 1881
 , a ship of the Scandinavian American Line scrapped in 1935
 , the name of several U.S. Navy ships
 United States, a presidential railcar built for Abraham Lincoln

See also
 
 
 
 American (disambiguation)
 American republic (disambiguation)
 United Kingdom (disambiguation)
 United Provinces (disambiguation)
 United State (disambiguation)
 The United States of America (disambiguation)
 United States of North America (disambiguation)
 List of countries that include United States in their name
 U.S. state, a constituent political entity of the United States of America
 Demonyms for the United States